Vértigo is the fourth studio album by Mexican singer Fey. It was released on May 21, 2002 by Epic Records and Sony Music Mexico. The album was an instant success in Latin America, topping the album charts. The album took 2 years to complete. Musically, it incorporates elements of europop, electronica and alternative pop. It debuted at number one in Fey's native Mexico, topping the album charts and opening with an impressive 75,000 copies. Vertigo was the last album Fey released with Sony Music until 2012, when she signed a new record deal with the label.

Background and production
Originally released in Mexico as a double album featuring one disc in English and a second in Spanish, Vertigo became the fourth full-length record by Latin pop artist Fey. It was produced in England and the U.S. by Graeme Pleeth and Robert Jazayeri. Anticipated following the release of the Sé Lo Que Vendrá single, Vertigo achieved gold status in Mexico after selling 75,000 copies in two weeks.

Singles
The album spawned two official singles released over a period of 7 months. The first, "The Other Side", was released in April 2002 to critical acclaim and a successful run on many Latin charts. It is deemed as Fey's comeback single, peaking in the top ten in countries like Argentina, Mexico and Colombia. In late Autumn, the song "Dressing To Kill" was released as the 2nd single. "Romeo & Juliet" was released instead on February 7, 2003 as promo single in Colombia.

Track listing

Personnel
From Allmusic.com

Robin Barter - Guitar, Keyboards, Mixing, Producer, Programming
Pete Craigie - Mix
Paulo Forat 	- A&R
Jack Hues - Guitar Invited Player
Robert 'Esmail' Jazayeri - Producer
Ken Lewis - Mix
Terry Mettam - Guitar, Guitar (Acoustic)
Graeme Pleeth - Guitar, Keyboards, Mixing, Producer, Programming
Maury Stern & Fey  - Executive Producers
Kent Wood - Keyboards
Marino Parisotto - Photography

Release history

Spanish release

References

Fey (singer) albums
2002 albums